Alexander Carson may refer to:

Alexander Carson (author) (1776–1844), Irish author
Alexander Carson (filmmaker) (born 1982), Canadian filmmaker

See Also
Alex Carson (1923–1981), Canadian football player